The 2008 United States Senate election in Alaska was held on November 4, 2008. Incumbent Republican U.S. Senator and former President pro tempore Ted Stevens ran for re-election to a eighth term in the United States Senate. It was one of the ten Senate races that U.S. Senator John Ensign of Nevada, the chairman of the National Republican Senatorial Committee, predicted as being most competitive. The primaries were held on August 26, 2008. Stevens was challenged by Democratic candidate Mark Begich, the mayor of Anchorage and son of former U.S. Representative Nick Begich.

On October 27, 2008, Stevens was convicted on seven charges of ethics violations and corruption. If reelected, Stevens would have been the first convicted felon to be elected to the United States Senate. On November 18, 2008, the Associated Press called the race for Begich, making Stevens the longest-serving U.S. Senator ever to lose a re-election bid. Surpassing Warren Magnuson from the state of Washington, when he lost his seat to Slade Gorton in 1980. Stevens conceded the race to Begich on November 19.

Begich was the only Democrat in 2008 to flip a Senate seat in a state that Barack Obama lost in the concurrent presidential election. With a margin of 1.3%, this election was the second-closest race of the 2008 Senate election cycle, behind only the election in Minnesota. Begich was the first Democrat to be elected to the U.S. Senate in Alaska since Mike Gravel in 1974.

The Democrats would not win another statewide election in Alaska until 2022, when Mary Peltola was elected to the U.S. House of Representatives.

Background 
The FBI investigation and subsequent seven count indictment of Ted Stevens, as well as investigation of the state's only Representative, Don Young (R), generated some negative feelings in Alaska towards Republicans, even among Republican primary voters. Anchorage Mayor Mark Begich (son of the last Democratic Rep. from Alaska, Nick Begich) was courted by both the Democratic Congressional Campaign Committee and the Democratic Senatorial Campaign Committee. In February 2008, he announced the formation of an exploratory committee for the Senate seat. The possible Democratic field also included former Governor Tony Knowles, State Rep. Eric Croft and State Senators Hollis French and Johnny Ellis. Former Minority Leader of the Alaska House of Representatives Ethan Berkowitz was considered a possible candidate, but he decided to challenge Don Young instead. Sensing discontentment within the GOP, conservative Republican Dave Cuddy announced his candidacy for U.S. Senate in December 2007.

Stevens was perceived by many as corrupt, but was also highly regarded by many Alaskans for his ability to steer federal funding toward the state; he was the longest-serving Republican in the Senate entering 2008 (first elected in 1968), and through his seniority he amassed a great deal of influence there. The selection of Alaskan Governor Sarah Palin as the vice-presidential running-mate of Republican presidential candidate John McCain in late August 2008 coincided with a substantial improvement in Stevens' performance in opinion polls. A poll in August showed Begich with a 17% lead, but in early September a poll from the same source showed Begich leading Stevens by only 3%. Begich's campaign and some observers attributed this change to Palin's popularity and the enthusiasm stimulated by her selection, although Palin's own reputation was partially based on her perceived opposition to Stevens or distance from him. The Stevens campaign disputed the low numbers shown in the August poll and said that the numbers had improved in September because Stevens had begun heavily campaigning. His campaign also presented the relationship between Palin and Stevens as positive, contrary to some portrayals.

Stevens was convicted of seven felony counts of failing to report gifts on October 27, 2008. This was considered a serious setback in his already difficult bid for re-election; he had requested and received a quick trial in hopes of winning an acquittal before election day. After the verdict, Stevens maintained his innocence and said that he was still running for re-election.

ADL primary 
The ADL ballot contained all of the primary candidates for the Alaska Democratic Party, the Alaskan Independence Party, and Libertarian Party of Alaska.

Candidates

Alaskan Independence 
 Bob Bird

Democratic 
Mark Begich, Anchorage Mayor
Ray Metcalfe, former State Representative and founder of the Republican Moderate Party of Alaska
Frank Vondersaar, perennial candidate

Libertarian 
 Fredrick David Haase

Results

Republican primary

Candidates 
 Michael Corey, judge, attorney
 David Cuddy, former State Representative
 Gerald Heikes, minister
 Rick Sikma, pastor
 Ted Stevens, incumbent U.S. Senator since 1968
 Vic Vickers, former assistant State Comptroller
 Richard Wanda

Campaign 
With three and a half weeks to go before the primary, Stevens still held a large polling lead over chief rival Dave Cuddy, 59% to 19%. Political newcomer Vic Vickers said on July 28 that he expected to pour $750,000 of his own money into his bid to defeat Stevens. According to Rasmussen polling of Alaskans, Cuddy "does nearly as well against Begich" as Stevens, trailing Begich 50% to 35%, while Vickers trailed the expected Democratic nominee 55% to 22%.

Results 
In the Republican primary on August 26, results from 70.5% of precincts showed Stevens winning with 63% of the vote; Cuddy had 28% and Vickers had 6%.

General election

Candidates

Major 
 Mark Begich (D), Mayor of Anchorage
 Ted Stevens (R), incumbent U.S. Senator

Minor 
 Bob Bird (AI)
 Fredrick "David" Haase (L)
 Ted Gianoutsos (I)

Predictions

Polling

Results 
Begich won the election by 3,953 votes. Incumbent Stevens had held a lead of over 3,000 votes after election night, but a tally of nearly 60,000 absentee and mail-in ballots released on November 12 erased that lead and reduced the vote margin separating the candidates to less than 0.5%, with further counting, released on November 18, increasing the margin to more than 1% in favor of Begich. On November 19, 2008, Stevens conceded to Begich.

See also 
 2008 United States Senate elections
 List of United States senators from Alaska

References

External links 
 Alaska Division of Elections
 U.S. Congress candidates for Alaska at Project Vote Smart
 Alaska U.S. Senate race from Congress.org
 Alaska, U.S. Senate from CQ Politics
 Alaska U.S. Senate race from The Green Papers
 Alaska U.S. Senate from OurCampaigns.com
 Alaska U.S. Senate race from 2008 Race Tracker
 Campaign contributions from OpenSecrets
 Stevens vs Begich graph of multiple polls from Pollster.com
 2008 Election from The Anchorage Daily News newspaper
Official campaign websites
 Mark Begich, Democratic candidate
 Ted Gianoutsos, Veterans Party candidate
 Vic Vickers, Republican candidate

2008
Alaska
United States Senate
Mark Begich